This article provides details of international football games played by the Indonesia national football team from 2020 to present.

Results

2021

2022

2023

References

2020s in Indonesian sport
Indonesia national football team results